This is a list of notable alumni of Providence College.

Entertainment and communications
David Angell – Emmy Award-winning television producer, victim of the September 11 attacks (was a passenger of American Airlines Flight 11)
Doris Burke – sports analyst for ESPN, former Friars basketball player
David R. Colburn – author and professor of history
Wally Dunn – Broadway actor, most recently appeared in Gypsy and Spamalot
Brett Epstein – actor, playwright
Matt Farley – musician 
Peter Farrelly – film director, screenwriter, and producer
Janeane Garofalo – actress, comedian
Caryn James (as Caryn A. Fuoroli) – film and television critic, novelist
Mike Leonard – television journalist on NBC's Today Show
James O'Brien – film director, screenwriter, and producer
John O'Hurley – actor, television host
Sean McAdam – sportswriter covering the Boston Red Sox
Edward Scanlon – Executive Vice President (retired) of NBC
Paul G. Tremblay – author
Joseph Ungaro – newspaper journalist

Business
 Brian Burke – President of Hockey Operations of the Pittsburgh Penguins, former Friars ice hockey player
 Rich Gotham – President of Boston Celtics
 Karen Ignagni – President and CEO of America's Health Insurance Plans 
 Lou Lamoriello – General Manager of the New York Islanders
 John Marinatto – former Commissioner of the Big East Conference
 Arthur F. Ryan – former Chairman and CEO of Prudential Insurance Company of America
 Jack Tretton – former CEO of Sony Computer Entertainment America

Politics and law
Scott Avedisian – Mayor of Warwick, Rhode Island
Michael Napolitano ‐ Mayor of Cranston, Rhode Island 
Andrew Ouelette - Legal Council of Kyle Rittenhouse
Peter J. Barnes – Member of New Jersey State Parole Board, former New Jersey State Senator
Jack Brennan – former chief of staff to Richard Nixon
Frank Caprio – chief judge of Providence Municipal Court
Arn Chorn-Pond – international human rights activist
Jasiel Correia – former Mayor of Fall River, Massachusetts
Richard M. Daley – Former Mayor of Chicago
Richard J. Daronco – former United States federal judge
Tom Dart – Sheriff of Cook County, Illinois
Frank Devlin – former senior counsel to Exxon Mobil Corporation in Houston, Texas
Armando Diaz – Marshal of Italy, World War 1 commander (Providence College's first alumnus)
Chris Dodd – former United States Senator representing Connecticut 
Thomas J. Dodd – former United States Senator representing Connecticut
Benjamin Downing – currently the youngest Massachusetts State Senator
John H. Fanning – former National Labor Relations Board Chair
Joseph J. Fauliso – former Lt. Governor of Connecticut
Raymond Flynn – former Mayor of Boston, former Friars basketball player
Charles J. Fogarty – former Lt. Governor of Rhode Island
John E. Fogarty – former United States Congressman representing Rhode Island
Anthony D. Galluccio – former Massachusetts State Senator
Maureen McKenna Goldberg – Associate Justice of the Rhode Island Supreme Court
Sheila Harrington – Massachusetts State Representative for the First Middlesex District
Patrick J. Kennedy – former United States Congressman representing Rhode Island, son of former United States Senator Ted Kennedy
Kieran Lalor – founder of Eternal Vigilance Society and Iraq Vets for Congress
J. Howard McGrath – former United States Attorney General and United States Senator representing Rhode Island
William D. Mullins – member of the Massachusetts House of Representatives and baseball player
M. Teresa Paiva-Weed – President of the Rhode Island State Senate
Michael F. Rush – member of the Massachusetts House of Representatives
John Shea – former member of Connecticut House of Representatives
Fernand St. Germain – former United States Representative from Rhode Island
William J. Sullivan – former Chief Justice of the Connecticut Supreme Court
Robert Tiernan – former United States Representative from Rhode Island
Gregg M. Amore - Rhode Island Secretary of State

Academia
Roy Peter Clark – Vice President and Senior Scholar at the Poynter Institute
Hank Foley – President of New York Institute of Technology
Mark Stephen Jendrysik – Political Science and Public Administration Chair, University of North Dakota
Timothy J. Kehoe – Professor of Economics, University of Minnesota
Clark R. McCauley – Professor of Science and Mathematics and co-director of the Solomon Asch Center for Study of Ethnopolitical Conflict at Bryn Mawr College
Edward J. McElroy – President of American Federation of Teachers, Vice President of AFL-CIO
Austin Sarat – Professor of Jurisprudence and Political Science at Amherst College

Medicine
Robert Gallo – biomedical researcher known for the discovery of Human Immunodeficiency Virus

Religious life
Joseph Augustine Di Noia – named Secretary of the Congregation for Divine Worship and Discipline of the Sacraments by Pope Benedict XVI.; currently the highest-ranking Dominican in the Curia of the Roman Catholic Church
Archbishop Christopher Cardone, O. P. – Roman Catholic Metropolitan Archbishop of Auki, The Solomon Islands since 2016.
Archbishop Thomas Cajetan Kelly, O.P. – Roman Catholic Metropolitan Archbishop Emeritus of Louisville, Kentucky (1982-2007)
Brian Shanley, O.P. – President of Providence College

Athletics

Men's basketball
Marvin Barnes – former NBA and ABA all-star player
Ira Bowman – former NBA player
Marques Bragg – former NBA player
Marshon Brooks – NBA player with New Jersey Nets
Troy Brown – former NBA player
Marty Conlon – former NBA player
Austin Croshere – former NBA player
Sharaud Curry – international professional basketball player
Ernie DiGregorio – former NBA player
Billy Donovan – current head coach of Chicago Bulls. Former head coach of Oklahoma City Thunder, and two-time NCAA Men's Division I Basketball Championship head coach of Florida Gators men's basketball
Marcus Douthit – NBA and international professional basketball player
Kris Dunn – current NBA player, Portland Trail Blazers
Weyinmi Efejuku – international professional basketball player
Johnny Egan – former NBA player and coach
Raymond Flynn – former Mayor of Boston
Rubén Garcés – former NBA and international professional basketball player
Ryan Gomes – NBA player with Los Angeles D-Fenders
Joe Hassett – former NBA player
Herbert Hill – NBA and international professional basketball player
Jonathan Kale – international professional basketball player
Tuukka Kotti – international professional basketball player
Māris Ļaksa – international professional basketball player
Jim Larranaga – head coach of Miami Hurricanes men's basketball
John Linehan – international professional basketball player
Erron Maxey – international professional basketball player
Ken McDonald – head coach of the Austin Spurs
Donnie McGrath – international professional basketball player
Eric Murdock – former NBA player
Richard Pitino – head basketball coach for University of Minnesota
Mike Riordan – former NBA player
Karim Shabazz – international professional basketball player
God Shammgod – former NBA player
Abdul Shamsid-Deen – former international professional basketball player
Dickey Simpkins – former NBA player
Michael Smith – former NBA player
Kevin Stacom – former NBA player
Jamel Thomas – former NBA player
John Thompson – former Basketball Hall of Fame head coach of Georgetown Hoyas men's basketball
Otis Thorpe – former NBA all-star player
Jimmy Walker – former NBA all-star player
Franklin Western – international professional basketball player
Lenny Wilkens – Basketball Hall of Fame coach and player
Eric Williams – former NBA player
Jeff Xavier – international professional basketball player

Women's basketball
Doris Burke – sports analyst for ESPN

Men's ice hockey
Noel Acciari
Tim Army
Brian Burke – President and General Manager of the Toronto Maple Leafs
Rich Costello
Craig Darby
John Ferguson, Jr.
Rob Gaudreau
Hal Gill
Jon Gillies - Goaltender, New Jersey Devils
Paul Guay
Joe Hulbig
Dave Kelly
Regan Kelly
Kurt Kleinendorst
Jim Korn
Jeff Mason
Colin McDonald
Bob Nicholson
Gaetano Orlando
Fernando Pisani
Steve Rooney
Nolan Schaefer
Jeff Serowik
Peter Taglianetti
Brandon Tanev - Forward, Seattle Kraken
Chris Terreri
Chris Therien
Randy Velischek
Ron Wilson
Pete Zingoni

Women's ice hockey
Chris Bailey – member of the 1992, 1994, 1997, 1999, 2000 and 2001 US women's national ice hockey teams; member of the 1998 and 2002 US women's Olympic ice hockey teams; Olympic gold and silver medalist
Laurie Baker – member of the 1997 and 2000 US women's national ice hockey teams; member of the 1998 and 2002 US women's Olympic ice hockey teams;  Olympic gold and silver medalist
Alana Blahoski – member of the 1997, 1999, 2000, and 2001 US women's national ice hockey teams; member of the 1998 US women's Olympic ice hockey team; Olympic gold medalist
Lisa Brown-Miller – member of the 1990, 1992, 1994, and 1997 US women's national ice hockey teams; member of the 1998 women's Olympic ice hockey team;  Olympic gold medalist; former head coach of Princeton University's women's ice hockey team
Sara Decosta (born 1977) – member of the 2000 and 2001 US women's national ice hockey teams; member of the 1998 and 2002 US women's Olympic ice hockey teams;  Olympic gold and silver medalist
Cammi Granato – member of the 1990, 1992, 1994, 1997, 1999, 2000, 2001, 2004, and 2005 US women's national ice hockey teams; member of the 1998 and 2002 US women's Olympic ice hockey teams;  Olympic gold and silver medalist; member of the United States Hockey Hall of Fame and the Hockey Hall of Fame in Toronto; broadcaster during the 2010 Vancouver Olympics for NBC Sports
Mari Pehkonen – member of the 2006 and 2007 Finland women's national ice hockey team
Karen Thatcher – member of the 2009–10 United States women's national ice hockey team, Olympic silver medalist

Baseball
John McDonald
Lou Merloni
William D. Mullins
Birdie Tebbetts

Track and field
Mary Cullen – 2006 NCAA Champion, Irish long distance runner
Martin Fagan – Irish Olympic distance runner
Roisin McGettigan – Olympic 3000m steeplechase runner
Geoff Smith – won Boston Marathon in 1984 and 1985
Kim Smith – four-time NCAA Champion, Olympic distance runner for New Zealand
John Treacy – 1984 silver medal winner at the 1984 Summer Olympics

Football
Charles Avedisian – former New York Football Giants player
Hank Soar – former New York Football Giants player and American League umpire

Men's soccer
Chaka Daley
Chris Konopka
Ryan Maduro – All-American
Julian Gressel
Mac Steeves
Karl Anderson

References

Providence College